The 2014 FIM Superstock 1000 Cup was the sixteenth season of the FIM Superstock 1000 Cup, the tenth held under this name. The season was contested over seven rounds, beginning on 13 April at MotorLand Aragón in Spain, and concluding on 5 October at Circuit de Nevers Magny-Cours in France.

Barni Racing Team rider Leandro Mercado prevailed in a final round battle with Team Pedercini rider Lorenzo Savadori at Magny-Cours. Mercado, who won in Aragón and at Jerez, held a five-point lead over Savadori – who won back-to-back races at Misano and Portimão – prior to the race weekend. In the race, held in wet conditions, Savadori was leading until the penultimate lap when Matthieu Lussiana passed him. Thereafter, Savadori crashed while running in second position; he later remounted to finish in sixth position, but Mercado sealed the title by eight points, as he finished in fourth position. Lussiana's victory allowed him to finish in third place in the championship, while a second-place finish for Romain Lanusse also allowed him to overhaul David McFadden for fourth place in the final standings. Two other riders achieved race victories as Ondřej Ježek won at Imola, while Kevin Valk was able to take a home victory at Assen.

The manufacturers' championship was also decided in the final round. Ducati entered the event with a single-point lead over Kawasaki, but Lussiana's victory allowed Kawasaki to take the championship by eight points ahead of Ducati, with Jed Metcher recording the best finish at Magny-Cours of third place.

Race calendar and results
The Fédération Internationale de Motocyclisme released a 7-round provisional calendar on 29 November 2013; the schedule remained unchanged after the calendar update of 12 April 2014.

Entry list

All entries used Pirelli tyres.

Championship standings

Riders' championship

Manufacturers' championship

References

External links

FIM Superstock 1000 Cup seasons
Superstock 1000 Cup
Superstock 1000 Cup